Dilyan Kolev (born 9 November 1988) is a Bulgarian footballer who currently plays as a midfielder for Icelandic club Einherji.

Club career
Born in Byala, Rousse Province, Kolev played in the youth teams of PFC Litex Lovech. He represented Bulgarian teams PFC Lokomotiv Mezdra, Benkovski Byala, Kom-Minyor, OFC Sliven 2000 and PFC Chavdar Byala Slatina before moving abroad.

In the winter break of the 2011–12 season, he moved first time abroad, to play with Moldovan National Division side FC Costuleni. Then in the summer of 2012 he moved to Montenegro where he signed for FK Čelik Nikšić.

International career
In 2009, he was a member of the Bulgaria national under-21 football team.

References

External links
 

1988 births
Living people
Bulgarian footballers
Bulgarian expatriate footballers
Association football midfielders
PFC Lokomotiv Mezdra players
OFC Sliven 2000 players
PFC Kom-Minyor players
FC Lokomotiv 1929 Sofia players
First Professional Football League (Bulgaria) players
Expatriate footballers in Moldova
FK Čelik Nikšić players
OFK Titograd players
Expatriate footballers in Montenegro
Bulgarian expatriate sportspeople in Moldova
Bulgarian expatriate sportspeople in Iceland
Bulgarian expatriate sportspeople in Montenegro
Dilyan Kolev